Damir Puškar (born 3 September 1987) is a retired Slovenian futsal player who played as a goalkeeper. Between 2009 and 2020, he represented the Slovenia national team, making 115 appearances.

References

External links
NZS profile 
UEFA profile

1987 births
Living people
Sportspeople from Ljubljana
Futsal goalkeepers
Slovenian men's futsal players